The Mega and the Songwriter is an interactive musical variety talk show produced by the TV5 Entertainment Group which airs every Sunday at  on TV5. It hosted by Sharon Cuneta and Ogie Alcasid. The show features several music guests ranging from established acts to veteran singers. The show features various segments that encourages viewers to interact with the show through various social networking sites.

History
Launched on September 15, 2013, it is one of the 8 newly launched weekend programs under the "Weekend Do It Better" block of the network. The show is also Alcasid's first project under the channel following his transfer from GMA Network on August 6.

Last November 10, 2013, TMTS broadcast live for the first time; conducting a 5-hour live telethon special dedicated to the victims of Typhoon Yolanda. TV5 through the Alagang Kapatid Foundation, Inc. have raised P30 million pesos for the families affected by the Super Typhoon.

Segments
The program features various segments where the viewers can interact with the show and its co-host.

Philippine Online Sensation on TV (P.O.S.T) - viewers are asked to upload videos of themselves singing on YouTube. The co-hosts will randomly invite a lucky act onto the show to perform. 
Ask the Songwriter - Viewers submit any kind of story on the show's website. Ogie Alcasid will write an original song about the story and perform it on the show. 
IRequest by the Megastar - Viewers request a song for Sharon Cuneta via social media sites (Facebook, Twitter) to perform during the show.

Hosts
Ogie Alcasid
Sharon Cuneta

See also
TV5
List of programs broadcast by TV5
List of Philippine television shows

External links
TMTS Website

References

2013 Philippine television series debuts
2014 Philippine television series endings
TV5 (Philippine TV network) original programming
Filipino-language television shows